Statistics of Japanese Regional Leagues for the 1985 season.

Champions list

League standings

Hokkaido

Tohoku

Kanto

Hokushinetsu

Tokai

Kansai

Chūgoku

Shikoku

Kyushu

 

1985
Jap
Jap
3